Coloured Peak is a peak,  high, near the head of Ross Ice Shelf in the coastal foothills of the Queen Maud Mountains, about  southeast of O'Brien Peak. It was mapped by the United States Geological Survey from surveys and from U.S. Navy air photos, 1960–64. The peak was examined by members of the New Zealand Geological Survey Antarctic Expedition, 1969–70, and so named because of the colorful yellow, pink and brown banded strata that mark the feature.

References 

Mountains of the Ross Dependency
Amundsen Coast